Vanessa Marie Lee also known as Vanessa Lee (born 24 November 1983) is a Singaporean netball player and former captain of the Singapore national team who has been in international circuit since her debut in 2002. She has played at two World Cups in 2011, 2015 and has also represented Singapore at the 2006 Commonwealth Games, 2017 Southeast Asian Games and at the Asian Netball Championships. Vanessa Lee is regarded as one of the finest netball players to have emerged from Singapore. 

She initially retired from international netball in 2012 after winning the 2012 Asian Netball Championships defeating Sri Lanka and made her comeback into international arena in 2016 after four years to lead the national side.

In October 2018, she took a brief break from netball which meant she pulled out of the 2019 Netball World Cup and Charmaine Soh replaced her as the captain of the national side. In the same month, she was inducted into the Singapore Netball's Hall of Fame.

References 

1983 births
Living people
Singaporean netball players
Southeast Asian Games silver medalists for Singapore
Southeast Asian Games medalists in netball
Netball players at the 2006 Commonwealth Games
Commonwealth Games competitors for Singapore
Competitors at the 2017 Southeast Asian Games
Competitors at the 2019 Southeast Asian Games
Singaporean sportspeople of Chinese descent
21st-century Singaporean women